Grace Brethren Church may refer to:

 The Fellowship of Grace Brethren Churches, emerged in 1939 as a split from the Brethren Church
 The Conservative Grace Brethren Churches, International, emerged in 1992 as a split from Fellowship of Grace Brethren Churches